Waworada Bay or Waworada Gulf (Indonesian: Teluk Waworada) is a slender bay facing the Indian Ocean on Sumbawa Island, in the Bima Regency of the Indonesian Province of West Nusa Tenggara.

The bay opens towards Sape Strait.

External links
http://indahnesia.com/indonesia/SUBDIS/district_bima.php  Bima district

Bays of Indonesia
Landforms of Sumbawa
Landforms of West Nusa Tenggara